Here is a list of the longest hiking trails in the world from longest to shortest.

Trails over 1,500 kilometres in length
Grand Italian Trail – This trail is around  through Italy.
Continental Divide Trail – USA about 
Pacific Crest Trail – Extends from Mexico to Canada,  through California, Oregon and Washington. 
Great American Rail-Trail - A  cross country rail-trail in the United States.
Appalachian Trail – This trail is around  stretching throughout most of the east coastal United States.
The entire route network exceeds .
Camino de Santiago de Compostela – In France and Spain, about + long.

Trails under 1,500 kilometres in length
Great Baikal Trail is a series of trails in Russia projected to be finished in 2014. 
National Blue Trail in Hungary is 1,168 km (725 mi) long. 
Cesta hrdinov SNP in Slovakia 
The Main Beskid Trail in Poland is 
The Main Sudetes Trail Główny Szlak Sudecki in Poland is 

See also
List of longest state highways in the United States
List of longest tunnels
Long-distance trail
Navigation
Trail

References

Hiking trails